Khalid Hasan (14 July 1937 – 3 December 2013) was a Pakistani cricketer who represented the national side in a single Test match in 1954. Only 16 years and 352 days old on debut, he was the youngest Test player at the time, and remains the youngest player to play only a single Test match.As the match was dominated by England, he only got to bowl in one innings, however he did achieve the 
feat of bowling Denis Compton - albeit after the latter had scored a double century.  Khalid, a right-arm leg spinner, played 17 first-class matches in total, 14 of which came on Pakistan's 1954 tour of the British Isles.

See also
 List of Pakistan Test cricketers

References

External links

1937 births
2013 deaths
Lahore cricketers
Pakistani cricketers
Pakistan Test cricketers
Cricketers from Peshawar
Punjab (Pakistan) cricketers